Oliver Bearman (born 8 May 2005) is a British racing driver. He was the 2021 Italian and ADAC Formula 4 champion and is a member of the Ferrari Driver Academy. He raced for Prema Racing in the 2022 FIA Formula 3 Championship, ending the championship in third place, seven points off winner Victor Martins. 
In November 2022, the Italian Prema Racing announced Bearman’s move to FIA Formula 2 for the 2023 season.

Career

Karting career 
Bearman started karting competitively in 2013, when he raced in the championship of the Trent Valley Kart Club, his local karting club. He then moved to compete in the Super 1 National Championships, where he managed a best finish of second in 2016 and 2017 respectively, driving in the Cadet category. The Brit then won the Kartmasters British Grand Prix in 2017, and he finished his karting career off strongly in 2019 with victory in the IAME International Final, IAME Euro Series and IAME Winter Cup.

Lower formulae

2020 
In 2020 Bearman made his single-seater debut in the ADAC Formula 4 Championship with US Racing, whilst also racing in three rounds of Italian F4. His campaign in the German series started off with regular points finishes in the first two rounds, before achieving his debut victory at the Hockenheimring. Bearman followed that up by scoring two further podiums, one at the Nürburgring and Oschersleben respectively, and finished seventh in the standings, ahead of fellow rookie teammate Vladislav Lomko, but behind top rookie and fellow teammate Tim Tramnitz. In his appearances in the Italian Championship, the Briton scored a total of two podiums, with one of them being a race win in Vallelunga, leading to him finishing tenth in the end results.

2021 

For the 2021 season, Bearman switched to Van Amersfoort Racing to perform double duties in both the German and Italian F4 Championships. In the Italian series, the Brit would kick off his season with a third place at the Circuit Paul Ricard. Following another podium in the same round Bearman went on a podium and win streak, which would last for nine and seven races respectively. This included two victories in Misano, a hattrick of wins at the Vallelunga Circuit and two wins in Imola. However, a disqualification from the third Imola race for an engine irregularity meant that Bearman would lose his streak, having originally won the race. Undeterred, Bearman achieved his eighth win of the season at the following race at the Red Bull Ring, and followed it up with another podium in the second race. In the penultimate round of the season, Bearman won the title with a tenth place in the third race, putting the championship out of reach for his closest rival Tim Tramnitz.

In the German championship, Bearman claimed six victories and after a season-long battle with Tramnitz, claimed the title at the season finale at the Nürburgring, thus making him the first driver to achieve two successive Formula 4 titles in a single year.

In September 2021, as reward for his two F4 titles, Bearman was nominated for the Autosport BRDC Award. Additionally, in December 2021, Bearman was awarded the Henry Surtees Award for most outstanding performance by a BRDC rising star.

BRDC Formula 3 Championship 

Along with his duties in Formula 4, Bearman raced in the BRDC British Formula 3 Championship with Fortec Motorsports, partnering Roberto Faria and Mikkel Grundtvig. He started his campaign off strongly, scoring two second-place finishes in the first two races at Brands Hatch. Having skipped the following three rounds in order to concentrate on his F4 campaign, Bearman came back at the Snetterton Circuit, where he would win the opening race, and he would follow that up by qualifying on pole for the first race at Silverstone. However, his chances of victory were slashed after losing his front left wheel on the second lap, which meant that a second place in Race 2 would be the highest finish of his weekend.

FIA Formula 3 Championship 

On 31 October 2021 Bearman was announced to be participating in the post-season test of the FIA Formula 3 Championship with Prema Racing, partnering Jak Crawford, Arthur Leclerc and Paul Aron. At the end of the year, Bearman was announced to be driving with Prema for the 2022 season alongside Crawford and Leclerc.

Bearman started his season by controlling the first race of the year in Bahrain, although, having crossed the finish line in first place, he was issued a penalty for multiple track limits breaches, which demoted him to second behind Isack Hadjar. A sixth place in the feature race was followed up by a disappointing event at Imola: there, having been denied a points finish in the first race due to a spin that had come as a direct result of teammate Leclerc pushing him onto the grass, Bearman was battling to remain in third place near the end of Sunday's feature race. On the final lap, the Brit caused a collision with Grégoire Saucy at the penultimate corner, which sent the Swiss driver out of the race and caused Bearman to be demoted from fourth to 17th after the race had finished. The next round would pan out more quietly, as a fifth place on Sunday became the Brit's best feature race result at the time.

Bearman would gain form in the subsequent three rounds, as he finished third in all three feature races: Silverstone, where he battled his compatriot Zak O'Sullivan to the line for second, Spielberg, where Bearman had kept his position from start to finish, and Budapest, having been denied second by a fraction of a second. At Spa-Francorchamps, the first event after the summer break, Bearman was able to fight his way to the front during the opening embers of the sprint race, having started from fifth, and took his first victory in the category despite a pair of Safety cars and a Red flag interruption interfering with his race. The following day, Bearman once again finished third in the feature race, having overtaken Oliver Goethe on the final lap. Misfortune followed in Zandvoort, as a red flag hampered Bearman's qualifying efforts, leaving the Brit 14th on the grid. During the feature race, a penalty for a collision with O'Sullivan meant that Bearman would not add to his points tally. Undeterred by his slim title chances going into the season finale at Monza, Bearman would finish second in the sprint race courtesy of a double-overtake on Jonny Edgar and Caio Collet into the first chicane. He continued his fight on Sunday, battling for the lead with Zane Maloney before a red flag would end the race prematurely, meaning that Bearman would finish third in the standings, a mere seven points behind champion Victor Martins. Despite being regretful of "all the races where [he] needlessly lost points", the Briton maintained that he was happy to finish third in the championship.

FIA Formula 2 Championship 
On 14 November 2022, Bearman was announced as a Prema Racing driver for the 2023 Formula 2 Championship, partnering Mercedes junior Frederik Vesti. Bearman started his season in Bahrain with 12th in qualifying, but could not salvage much in the sprint race, finishing P15. Taking advantage of lap 1 chaos in the feature race, Bearman rose to fourth early on. However, tyre degradation proved to be a factor as he was among the first to pit, and fell down the order late on for a disappointing 14th place.

Formula One 
In October 2021, Bearman was named as one of the finalists of the Ferrari Driver Academy's Scouting World Final. The following month, Bearman was confirmed to be joining the Academy along with karting champion Rafael Câmara.

Personal life 
Bearman's younger brother Thomas currently races karts. In club racing, their father, David, drove with the number 87, chosen because Ollie was born on May 8 and Thomas on August 7; both brothers have since raced with the number.

Karting record

Karting career summary

Racing record

Racing career summary 

* Season still in progress.

Complete ADAC Formula 4 Championship results 
(key) (Races in bold indicate pole position) (Races in italics indicate fastest lap)

Complete Italian F4 Championship results 
(key) (Races in bold indicate pole position) (Races in italics indicate fastest lap)

Complete GB3 Championship results 
(key) (Races in bold indicate pole position) (Races in italics indicate fastest lap)

Complete Formula Regional Asian Championship results
(key) (Races in bold indicate pole position) (Races in italics indicate the fastest lap of top ten finishers)

Complete FIA Formula 3 Championship results 
(key) (Races in bold indicate pole position) (Races in italics indicate fastest lap)

Complete FIA Formula 2 Championship results 
(key) (Races in bold indicate pole position) (Races in italics indicate points for the fastest lap of top ten finishers)

* Season still in progress.

References

External links 
 
 

2005 births
Living people
Italian F4 Championship drivers
Italian F4 champions
ADAC Formula 4 drivers
ADAC Formula 4 champions
English racing drivers
US Racing drivers
Van Amersfoort Racing drivers
BRDC British Formula 3 Championship drivers
FIA Formula 3 Championship drivers
Prema Powerteam drivers
Formula Regional Asian Championship drivers
Fortec Motorsport drivers
Mumbai Falcons drivers
FIA Formula 2 Championship drivers